Roby Brock is a media executive, journalist, and political reporter in Arkansas. He hosts a television show and radio show and is CEO of a media company.

His show Talk Business and Politics (TB&P) aired on Fox affiliate KLRT-TV. Guests have included Rex Nelson. Brock has written for Arkansas Democrat-Gazette and Arkansas Business.

Education
Brock graduated from Hendrix College in 1988.

Career
Brock worked on Bill Clinton's 1992 presidential campaign. He also worked for Arkansas governor Jim Guy Tucker. Brock was the initial director of Arkansas' State Election Commission and ran for a state senate seat.

Brock is CEO of Natural State Media the parent company for Talk Business & Politics and The Northwest Arkansas Business Journal. He founded River Rock Communications, the firm that produces his show and documentaries. He hosts and executive produces Talk Business & Politics a multi-media news organization covering business and politics in Arkansas. Brock also moderates radio programs on Arkansas NPR affiliates  and daily digital newscasts at the TalkBusiness.net website.

Dispute with Arkansas governor Mike Huckabee
In 2003, Brock reached a settlement with Mike Huckabee and the Arkansas Educational Television Network after Brock filed a lawsuit alleging that the defendants had conspired to remove his television program from the air.

References

External links
TB&P entries by Brock

Year of birth missing (living people)
Living people
American male journalists
Hendrix College alumni
21st-century American journalists
Journalists from Arkansas